Sparganothoides prolesana is a species of moth of the family Tortricidae. It is found in Costa Rica.

The length of the forewings is 6.4–7.1 mm for males and about 7.7 mm for females. The ground colour of the forewings is brownish yellow to golden yellow, with orange and brown scaling. The hindwings are yellowish white, but yellow near the anal angle. Adults have been recorded on wing from May to July.

Etymology
The species name refers to the close relationship with Sparganothoides torusana and is derived from Latin proles (meaning youth or offspring).

References

Moths described in 2009
Sparganothoides